This is a list of Portuguese television related events from 2003.

Events
1 June - Sofia Barbosa wins the first series of Operação triunfo.
5 September - The Portuguese version of Pop Idol debuts on SIC.
31 December - Fernando Geraldes wins the fourth and final series of Big Brother.

Debuts
16 February - Operação triunfo (2003-2011)
5 September - Ídolos (2003-2005)

Television shows

Ending this year
Big Brother (2000-2003)

Births

Deaths